The 2014 Campeonato Paraense de Futebol was the 102nd edition of Pará's top professional football league. The competition began in October 30, 2013 and ended on June 8, 2014. Remo won the championship by the 43rd time.

Format
The competition has three stages. On the First stage, 8 teams play a single round-robin. The two teams with the worst campaign on this stage are relegated to the state's second division.

On the Second stage, there are two rounds. Each round is a round-robin. The four best teams in each round advances to a playoff, so the winner of the round can be found.

On the Final stage, each round winner plays in the final. If the same team wins both round, that team is the champion.

The champion, the runner-up and the 3rd-placed team qualify to the 2015 Copa do Brasil and 2015 Copa Verde. The best team who isn't on Campeonato Brasileiro Série A, Série B or Série C qualifies to Série D.

Participating Teams

First stage

Second stage

First stage (Taça ACLEP)

Results

Second stage

First round (Taça Cidade de Belém)

Standings

Playoffs

Semifinals

First leg

Second leg

Finals

Remo won the First round and Taça Cidade de Belém.

Second round (Taça Estado do Pará)

Standings

Playoffs

Semifinals

First leg

Second leg

Finals

Paysandu won the Second round and Taça Estado do Pará.

Finals

Remo won the 2014 Campeonato Paraense.

References

Para
Campeonato Paraense